Enders is an unincorporated community and census-designated place in Chase County, Nebraska, United States. As of the 2010 census it had a population of 42. Although Enders is unincorporated, it has a post office, with the ZIP code of 69027.

Geography

Enders is located on the north shore of Enders Reservoir. Enders Dam was built on Frenchman Creek in 1947-1951 as part of the Missouri Basin Program of the Bureau of Reclamation. Enders Reservoir State Recreation Area is a popular location for fishing, hunting and other outdoor recreation activities.

Demographics

History
Enders was established on the present site in 1890. The village was relocated to the railroad line which was to be built to Imperial. Enders Post Office was established Aug. 26, 1890, with William A. Reid as postmaster. After being closed in 1893, the post office was reestablished in 1907 with George W. Brown as postmaster. The village was named for Peter Enders, a local pioneer rancher.

Enders was one of the first communities in western Nebraska to be served with electrical power. An irrigation and power dam was located south of the village on Frenchman Creek. The dam and generator were operated by Ralph Grosbach. The location of the power dam was flooded when Enders Dam was finished in 1951.

References

Census-designated places in Chase County, Nebraska
Census-designated places in Nebraska